Vern T. Miyagi is a former administrator of the Hawaii Emergency Management Agency (HI-EMA) who was responsible for the day-to-day operations of HI-EMA from September 11, 2015 to January 30, 2018. Before that he was executive officer at HI-EMA. He is a retired United States Army major general with over 37 years service. In January 2018 he took responsibility for the false issue of a warning of nuclear attack on Hawaii even though it was not him who mistakenly issued the warning. He resigned on January 30, 2018, in response to the false alarm.

References

External links
http://www.msnbc.com/weekends-with-alex-witt/watch/emergency-administrator-vern-miyagi-explains-hawaii-s-false-alarm-1136922179660

Living people
American civil servants
United States Army generals
National Guard (United States) generals
University of Hawaiʻi alumni
American accountants
Year of birth missing (living people)